Norwell is a town in Plymouth County, Massachusetts, United States. The population was 11,351 at the 2020 United States census. The town's southeastern border runs along the North River.

History
Norwell was first settled in 1634 as a part of the settlement of Satuit (later Scituate), which encompassed present-day Scituate and Norwell. It was officially created in 1849 and soon became known as South Scituate. The town changed its name by ballot to Norwell in 1888, after Henry Norwell, a dry goods merchant who provided funds for the maintenance of the town roads. Early settlers were attracted to Norwell for agricultural reasons, with the town later developing a major shipbuilding industry, based on the North and Northwest rivers. Shipbuilding was a major industry in the 18th through the early 19th centuries. Some of the finest frigates, schooners, whalers, and merchant vessels were produced in Norwell. The Norwell Village Area Historic District is in the center of the town.

Today, Norwell is an affluent residential community with over 10,000 residents that has modern schools, shopping, churches, libraries, health facilities, a wildlife preserve, and other support facilities as well as three industrial parks.

Geography
Some 30% to 38% of the town is wetlands. Located on the South Shore of Massachusetts, Norwell is bordered by Hanover and Rockland on the west, Pembroke on the south, Marshfield and Scituate on the east and northeast, and Hingham on the north.

Much of Norwell's eastern border lies along the North River, where many shipbuilding companies once stood. There are many other brooks and ponds throughout the town, including Third Herring Brook, which constitutes much of the town's border with Hanover, Accord Pond at the junction of Norwell, Rockland and Hingham, and Jacobs Pond, along Route 123. The northern half of the town is hilly, and the southern end of Wompatuck State Park juts into the town.

Demographics

As of the census of 2000, there were 9,765 people, 3,250 households, and 2,710 families residing in the town. The racial makeup of the town was 97.58% White, 0.37% African American, 0.05% Native American, 1.16% Asian, 0.16% from other races, and 0.68% from two or more races. Hispanic or Latino of any race were 0.63% of the population.

There were 3,250 households, out of which 42.2% had children under the age of 18 living with them, 74.6% were married couples living together, 6.5% had a female householder with no husband present, and 16.6% were non-families. 14.2% of all households were made up of individuals, and 6.9% had someone living alone who was 65 years of age or older. The average household size was 2.94 and the average family size was 3.27.

In the town, the population was spread out, with 28.6% under the age of 18, 4.3% from 18 to 24, 25.6% from 25 to 44, 28.9% from 45 to 64, and 12.6% who were 65 years of age or older. The median age was 40 years. For every 100 females, there were 95.5 males. For every 100 females age 18 and over, there were 90.6 males.

The median income for a household in the town was $113,944, and the median income for a family was $122,222. Males had a median income of $66,406 versus $40,625 for females. The per capita income for the town was $48,440. About 1.4% of families and 1.9% of the population were below the poverty line, including 1.9% of those under age 18 and 2.2% of those age 65 or over.

Government

On the national level, Norwell is a part of Massachusetts's 9th congressional district, and is currently represented by Bill Keating. The state's Junior (Class II) member of the United States Senate, elected in 2013, is Ed Markey. The senior (Class I) senator, elected in 2012, is Elizabeth Warren.

On the state level, Norwell is represented in the Massachusetts House of Representatives as a part of the Fifth Plymouth district by Rep. David DeCoste, which includes the neighboring towns of Hanover and Rockland. The town is represented in the Massachusetts Senate by Sen. Patrick O'Connor as a part of the Plymouth and Norfolk district, which includes the towns of Cohasset, Duxbury, Hingham, Hull, Marshfield, Scituate and Weymouth. The town is home to the First Barracks of Troop D of the Massachusetts State Police.

Norwell is governed on the local level by the open town meeting form of government, and is led by a Town Administrator and a board of selectmen. The town operates its own police and fire departments. In 2015 a new police headquarters building was added to the Fire Department Headquarters, originally built in 1999, located on Route 53 on the West side of town. Emergency Communications have been consolidated with the towns of Hingham, Cohasset, and Hull in a Hingham location.  Norwell has an emergency services division within the Fire Department; all emergency room visits are brought to South Shore Hospital. The town has its own post office, located at the town's center.

There are three libraries throughout the town, two of which are independent. The Norwell Public Library, temporarily relocated to Route 53 in Hanover while a new facility is presently under construction behind the high school near Assinippi, belongs to the Old Colony Library Network (OCLN). The James Library and Center for the Arts is located near the town center, and is associated with the First Parish Church of Norwell. The James Library was founded by Josiah Leavitt James of Chicago, a former resident of South Scituate, who was persuaded by Rev. William Hamilton Fish, minister of First Parish Church, to fund a town library. The South Shore Natural Science Center, located next to Jacobs Pond, also has a small nature library.

Education

Norwell has a school department for its approximately 2,200 students. There are two elementary schools for students from pre-kindergarten through fifth grade—the Grace F. Cole Elementary School in the western part of town and the William G. Vinal Elementary School in the east. The Norwell Middle School, near the Town Hall on Route 123, serves grades 6 to 8. It has two teams (sets of teachers) for each grade: Orange (6th), Purple (6th), Green (7th), Gold (7th), Red (8th) and Blue (8th).

Norwell High School is near Assinippi and serves students from ninth through twelfth grade. All high school and middle school students are provided with iPads by the district for school use. Norwell High School is a competitive school, known for its academic excellence.

Norwell High's teams are known as the Clippers, and their colors are blue and gold. The school's major rival is Hanover High School, whom the football team plays in their annual Thanksgiving Day game. At the high school, Norwell is very well known nationwide for their FIRST robotics team 348, which consistently performs well and won second place overall at the Florida Regionals in March 2015 in addition to other awards in the past few seasons. Norwell is also known for its extremely successful math team and award-winning theater company, the Fourth Wall Players. Norwell girls' lacrosse is well known on the South Shore, having won three Division II state championships.

Norwell's girls soccer team and boys soccer team also perform consistently well, with the boys team finishing as finalists in the Division III state tournament in 2017, and the girls soccer team winning their first Division III Massachusetts state title in November 2018. In 2021, both the Girls and Boys soccer teams won the Division III state championship title.

There are no private schools in the town. High school students have the option of attending South Shore Regional Vocational Technical High School in neighboring Hanover free of charge. The nearest college is Massasoit Community College in Brockton.

Transportation
Massachusetts Route 3 passes through the town twice, across the southern portion of the town and another short portion near the west of the town. There are no exits in the town off this freeway, but there are exits, 13 and 14, in the interim space between the two portions and just north of the second portion. Both exits access routes which immediately enter the town. The major route through the town is Route 123, which passes from east to west through the town, just before its end at Route 3A in neighboring Scituate. Routes 53 and 228 also pass through the town, with Route 228 ending just over the town line in Rockland at its intersection with Route 3.

Norwell has no rail or air service within the town. The nearest rail service is the Greenbush line of the MBTA's commuter rail in neighboring Scituate, just one mile from the Norwell town line. The nearest regional airport is Marshfield Municipal Airport; the nearest national and international service can be reached at Logan International Airport in Boston.

Norwell began construction of their "pathways" in the summer of 2015. These mixed use pedestrian and cycling paths were designed to connect the high school, middle school, and the town center. The pathways were intended, according to the former town planner, to allow residents and students to travel without walking on the side of Norwell's busiest roads. "Pathway" planning in Norwell has not been without controversy between town boards and residents. Ironically, Norwell after a successful ten-taxpayer lawsuit that prohibited the use of Community Preservation funds from building what one town official called, instead of a sidewalk, a "pathwalk," along Norwell's busiest road (Route 123) only 600' parallel north of the pathway, voters regardlessly approved the necessary appropriations to build a portion of it. The pathway stretches from South Street to the town center near the state police barracks. Today. Norwell residents have the choice of walking along the preferred, beautifully serene and forested pathway or the less frequented, traditional sidewalk along Main Street. Main Street remains the only road in the town for which taxpayers have provided funding for both a pathway on one side and a sidewalk on the other for the convenience, safety, and enjoyment of its users.

Notable people

 Gleason Archer, summer resident, Christian theologian
 Gleason Archer, Sr., summer resident, founder of Suffolk Law School
 Jan Brett, children's author/illustrator
 William Penn Brooks, American agricultural scientist
 John Cheever, author of Falconer and The Wapshot Chronicle, is buried in Norwell
 Drew Commesso, hockey player
 Jennifer Coolidge, actress
 Jeff Corwin, naturalist, television show host on Animal Planet
 Charles N. Gardner, Medal of Honor recipient during the American Civil War
 Hannah Packard James (1835–1903), librarian 
 Eric Maleson, Olympic Bobsled Athlete, 2002 Olympics
 Les Sampou, folk singer and songwriter
 John R. Stilgoe, American historian. Stilgoe was born in Norwell.
 Susan Tedeschi, blues musician
 Dan Wetzel, sportswriter
 Laura Wilson (photographer), Wilson was raised in Norwell. Her son is actor, Owen Wilson

References and footnotes

External links

 Town of Norwell official website
 Norwell Public Schools
 Norwell Public Library
 Answer Book/Norwell: Everything you need to know

 
Towns in Plymouth County, Massachusetts
Towns in Massachusetts